Trigonopterus cupreus is a species of flightless weevil in the genus Trigonopterus from Indonesia.

Etymology
The specific name is derived from the Latin word cupreus, meaning "copper-colored".

Description
Individuals measure around 2.43–3.05 mm in length.  The head, legs, and ventral surface are rust colored, and the elytra are a reddish-copper color.  The pronotum can either be reddish-copper like the elytra, or it can be bronze or green.

Range

Phylogeny
T. cupreus is part of the T. dimorphus species group.

References

cupreus
Beetles described in 2014
Beetles of Asia
Insects of Indonesia